East Farmingdale is a hamlet and a census-designated place (CDP) in Suffolk County, on Long Island, in New York. The population of the CDP was 6,484 at the 2010 census. Located in the Town of Babylon, the residents are served by the Farmingdale Post Office.

In the past, some or all East Farmingdale was proposed to become part of the never-realized Incorporated Village of Half Hollow Hills.

History 
Around 2001, East Farmingdale and its neighbors Dix Hills, Melville, and Wheatley Heights (all partially or wholly within the Half Hollow Hills Central School District) proposed incorporating as a single village called the Incorporated Village of Half Hollow Hills. These plans failed and each remain unincorporated hamlets to this day.

Geography

East Farmingdale is bordered to the west by South Farmingdale, the village of Farmingdale, to the north Melville, and to the northwest by Old Bethpage, to the east by Wyandanch and West Babylon, to the southeast by North Lindenhurst, and to the south by North Amityville.

Demographics

As of the 2010 Census, there were 6,484 people and 2,002 households, with 3.00 persons per household. The population density was 1,137.5 per square mile (438.1 per km2).

There were 2,114 housing units, of which 68.7% were owner-occupied. 5.3% of housing units were vacant and 31.3% of occupied housing units were occupied by renters.

The racial makeup of the CDP was 71.6% White, 12.5% African American, 0.2% Native American, 5.1% Asian, 0.1% Pacific Islander, 7.4% from other races, and 3.1% from two or more races. Hispanic or Latino of any race were 20.9% of the population. The CDP was 59.8% non-Hispanic White.

There were 2,002 households, out of which 36.4% had children under the age of 18 living with them, 52.6% were  headed by married couples living together, 12.5% had a female householder with no husband present, and 29.6% were non-families. 24.7% of all households were made up of individuals, and 13.1% were someone living alone who was 65 years of age or older. The average household size was 3.00 and the average family size was 3.55.

In the CDP, the population was spread out, with 22.1% under the age of 18, 15.3% from 18 to 24, 25.6% from 25 to 44, 25.2% from 45 to 64, and 11.7% who were 65 years of age or older. The median age was 35.6 years.

For the period 2007–2011, an estimated 86.4% of the population had lived in the same house 1 year and over. 20.8% of the population were foreign-born, and 27.5% of residents at least 5 years old spoke a language other than English at home.

Over the period 2007-2011, 85.0% of residents at least 25 years old had graduated high school, and 26.9% of residents at least 25 years old had a bachelor's degree or higher. The mean travel time to work for workers aged 16 and over was 28.2 minutes.

Between 2007 and 2011, the median annual income for a household in the CDP was an estimated $86,000. The per capita income for the CDP was $30,723. 3.3% of the population were below the poverty line. 26.4% of the housing units in the community were in multi-unit structures, and the median value of owner-occupied housing units was $423,200.

Local attractions
Route 110 (Broad Hollow Road) is one of the largest business corridors on Long Island, many Long Island companies are based in East Farmingdale. Farmingdale State College is located in the northwestern part of the CDP, Republic Airport is located in the center of the CDP, and Saint Charles Cemetery is just east of the airport. These two areas make up about one-third of the CDP's land area. Adventureland, one of Long island's most popular amusement parks, is located in East Farmingdale right across the street from Farmingdale State College.

Education
The area north of Conklin Street is all within the Half Hollow Hills Central School District. Most elementary students go to Chestnut Hill School, but a few go to Paumanok or Signal Hill. All secondary school students go to West Hollow Middle School and Hills East High School.

South of Conklin Street, most of East Farmingdale is in the Farmingdale Union Free School District. The entire Saint Charles Cemetery is actually in the Half Hollow Hills School District, but there are of course no residential homes. There is also a small area of East Farmingdale within the Copiague Union Free School District, but again no residential homes are in this area.

All East Farmingdale elementary students in the Farmingdale Union Free School District attend Saltzman East Memorial Elementary School, which is the only public school in East Farmingdale.

References

Babylon (town), New York
Census-designated places in New York (state)
Hamlets in New York (state)
Census-designated places in Suffolk County, New York
Hamlets in Suffolk County, New York